Chad Clark may refer to:

Chad Clark (drummer), American drummer, formerly with Heaven Below
Chad Clark (tennis) (born 1973), former American tennis player